The National Trail Conference (NTC) is a historic high school conference in east central Illinois. The conference participates in athletics and activities in the Illinois High School Association (IHSA). The conference comprises eleven public high schools and one private high school with small enrollments in portions of Effingham, Fayette, Shelby, Cumberland and Clay counties.

Founded in 1935, the National Trail Conference was named after the National Road, which runs through the heart of the conference in Effingham and Fayette Counties and coincides with U.S. Route 40.

While none of the schools in the NTC (as it is informally known) sponsor football, the conference is well-recognized around the state for having strong boys and girls basketball teams. The Teutopolis Lady Shoes have won five state titles, the second-most of any team in Illinois, while the Teutopolis boys have won one state title (in 1986) and numerous regional and sectional crowns. Effingham St. Anthony, Stewardson-Strasburg, and St. Elmo have also made appearances at the Illinois high school boys basketball championship, while Cowden-Herrick/Beecher City (a co-op between two member schools in girls basketball) has made two appearances (2010, 2012) in the girls final four.

Member Schools

Sources:IHSA Conferences and IHSA Member Schools Directory

Former Members

History
The National Trail Conference (NTC) was established in 1935. Nine of the twelve schools — all except Dieterich, South Central, and North Clay — have been members since the conference's founding. Their respective consolidations (Stewardson-Strasburg and Cowden-Herrick) would retain membership in the conference.

The conference's membership stayed stable from 1971 until the 2009 season, when Dieterich became a full-time member after leaving the Midland Trail Conference. Teutopolis left in 2012 to become an independent and play schools closer to its size, as the school was twice the size of most of the schools in the conference. South Central left the Midland Trail Conference to join the NTC and replace Teutopolis for the 2012-13 school year. North Clay left the Midland Trail Conference to join the NTC for the 2016-2017 school year  making them the 3rd school to leave the MTC for the NTC in 7 years.

Competitive Success
National Trail Conference teams have won 18 state championships in IHSA sponsored athletics and activities, most recently the 2017 Class 1A boys state basketball championship, won by St. Anthony. NTC teams have won numerous regional and sectional titles and most have competed in the final four at least once in either boys or girls basketball.

Cooperative Arrangements
In academic years 2021-22
 Cowden-Herrick and Beecher City
 Brownstown and St. Elmo
 Windsor and Stewardson-Strasburg

References

External links
 National Trail Conference

Illinois high school sports conferences